The Panama Canal is an artificial  waterway in Panama that connects the Atlantic Ocean with the Pacific Ocean and divides North and South America. The canal cuts across the Isthmus of Panama and is a conduit for maritime trade. One of the largest and most difficult engineering projects ever undertaken, the Panama Canal shortcut greatly reduces the time for ships to travel between the Atlantic and Pacific oceans, enabling them to avoid the lengthy, hazardous Cape Horn route around the southernmost tip of South America via the Drake Passage or Strait of Magellan and the even less popular route through the Arctic Archipelago and the Bering Strait.

Colombia, France, and later the United States controlled the territory surrounding the canal during construction. France began work on the canal in 1881, but stopped because of lack of investors' confidence due to engineering problems and a high worker mortality rate. The United States took over the project on May 4, 1904, and opened the canal on August 15, 1914.  The US continued to control the canal and surrounding Panama Canal Zone until the 1977 Torrijos–Carter Treaties provided for handover to Panama. After a period of joint American–Panamanian control, the canal was taken over by the Panamanian government in 1999. It is now managed and operated by the government-owned Panama Canal Authority.

A third, wider lane of locks was constructed between September 2007 and May 2016. The expanded waterway began commercial operation on June 26, 2016. The new locks allow transit of larger, New Panamax ships.

Annual traffic has risen from about 1,000 ships in 1914, when the canal opened, to 14,702 vessels in 2008, for a total of 333.7 million Panama Canal/Universal Measurement System (PC/UMS) tons. By 2012, more than 815,000 vessels had passed through the canal. In 2017 it took ships an average of 11.38 hours to pass between the canal's two locks. The American Society of Civil Engineers has ranked the Panama Canal one of the seven wonders of the modern world.

History

Early proposals in Panama

The earliest record regarding a canal across the Isthmus of Panama was in 1534, when Charles V, Holy Roman Emperor and King of Spain, ordered a survey for a route through the Americas in order to ease the voyage for ships traveling between Spain and Peru. The Spanish were seeking to gain a military advantage over the Portuguese.

In 1668, the English physician and philosopher Sir Thomas Browne speculated in his encyclopedic work, Pseudodoxia Epidemica, that "some Isthmus have been eaten through by the Sea, and others cut by the spade: And if the policy would permit, that of Panama in America were most worthy the attempt: it being but few miles over, and would open a shorter cut unto the East Indies and China".

In 1788, American Thomas Jefferson, then Minister to France, suggested that the Spanish should build the canal, since they controlled the colonies where it would be built. He said that this would be a less treacherous route for ships than going around the southern tip of South America, and that tropical ocean currents would naturally widen the canal after construction. During an expedition from 1788 to 1793, Alessandro Malaspina outlined plans for construction of a canal. Given the strategic location of Panama, and the potential of its narrow isthmus separating two great oceans, other trade links in the area were attempted over the years. The ill-fated Darien scheme was launched by the Kingdom of Scotland in 1698 to set up an overland trade route. Generally inhospitable conditions thwarted the effort, and it was abandoned in April 1700.

Numerous canals were built in other countries in the late 18th and early 19th centuries. The success of the Erie Canal through central New York in the United States in the 1820s, and the collapse of the Spanish Empire in Latin America resulted in growing American interest in building an inter-oceanic canal. Beginning in 1826, US officials began negotiations with Gran Colombia (present-day Colombia, Venezuela, Ecuador, and Panama), hoping to gain a concession to build a canal. Jealous of their newly gained independence and fearing domination by the more powerful United States, president Simón Bolívar and New Granada officials declined American offers. After the collapse of Gran Colombia, New Granada remained unstable under constant government intrigue.

Great Britain attempted to develop a canal in 1843. According to the New-York Daily Tribune, August 24, 1843, Barings Bank of London and the Republic of New Granada entered into a contract for the construction of a canal across the Isthmus of Darien (Isthmus of Panama). They referred to it as the Atlantic and Pacific Canal, and it was a wholly British endeavor. Projected for completion in five years, the plan was never carried out. At nearly the same time, other ideas were floated, including a canal (and/or a railroad) across Mexico's Isthmus of Tehuantepec. That did not develop, either.

In 1846, the Mallarino–Bidlack Treaty, negotiated between the US and New Granada, granted the United States transit rights and the right to intervene militarily in the isthmus. In 1848, the discovery of gold in California, on the West Coast of the United States, generated renewed interest in a canal crossing between the Atlantic and Pacific oceans. William H. Aspinwall, who had won the federal subsidy to build and operate the Pacific mail steamships at around the same time, benefited from the gold discovery. Aspinwall's route included steamship legs from New York City to Panama, and from Panama to California, with an overland portage through Panama. This route with an overland leg in Panama was soon frequently traveled, as it provided one of the fastest connections between San Francisco, California, and the East Coast cities, about 40 days' transit in total. Nearly all the gold that was shipped out of California went by the fast Panama route. Several new and larger paddle steamers were soon plying this new route, including private steamship lines owned by American entrepreneur Cornelius Vanderbilt that made use of an overland route through Nicaragua, and the unfortunate SS Central America.

In 1850 the United States began construction of the Panama Railroad (now called the Panama Railway) to cross the isthmus; it opened in 1855. This overland link became a vital piece of Western Hemisphere infrastructure, greatly facilitating trade. The later canal route was constructed parallel to it, as it had helped clear dense forests. An all-water route between the oceans was still the goal. In 1855 William Kennish, a Manx-born engineer working for the United States government, surveyed the isthmus and issued a report on a route for a proposed Panama Canal. His report was published as a book entitled The Practicability and Importance of a Ship Canal to Connect the Atlantic and Pacific Oceans.

In 1876, Lucien Napoléon Bonaparte Wyse and his chief assistant Armand Réclus, both officers and engineers of the French Navy, explored several routes in the Darien-Atrato regions, and made proposals including the construction of tunnels and locks.  A second Isthmian exploratory visit began on December 6, 1877, where two routes were explored in Panama, the San Blas route and a route from Limon Bay to Panama City, the current Canal route. The French had achieved success in building the Suez Canal in the Middle East. While it was a lengthy project, they were encouraged to plan for a canal to cross the Panamanian isthmus. Wyse went to Bogotá and on March 20, 1878, signed a treaty, in the name of the Société Civile Internationale du Canal Interocéanique par l'isthme du Darien headed by general Étienne Türr, with the Colombian government, known as the Wyse concession, to build an interoceanic canal through Panama.

French construction attempts, 1881–1899

The first attempt to construct a canal through what was then Colombia's province of Panama began on January 1, 1881. The project was inspired by the diplomat Ferdinand de Lesseps, who was able to raise considerable funds in France as a result of the huge profits generated by his successful construction of the Suez Canal. Although the Panama Canal needed to be only 40 percent as long as the Suez Canal, it was much more of an engineering challenge due to the combination of tropical rain forests, debilitating climate, the need for canal locks, and the lack of any ancient route to follow.

Lesseps wanted a sea-level canal (like the Suez), but he visited the site only a few times, during the dry season which lasts only four months of the year. The dense jungle was alive with venomous snakes, insects, and spiders, but the worst challenges were yellow fever, malaria, and other tropical diseases, which killed thousands of workers; by 1884, the death rate was over 200 per month. Public health measures were ineffective because the role of the mosquito as a disease vector was then unknown. Conditions were downplayed in France to avoid recruitment problems, but the high mortality rate made it difficult to maintain an experienced workforce.

Workers had to continually widen the main cut through the mountain at Culebra and reduce the angles of the slopes to minimize landslides into the canal. Steam shovels were used in the construction of the canal, purchased from Bay City Industrial Works, a business owned by William L. Clements in Bay City, Michigan. Bucket chain excavators manufactured by both Alphonse Couvreux and Wehyer & Richemond and Buette were also used. Other mechanical and electrical equipment was limited in capabilities, and steel equipment rusted rapidly in the rainy climate.

In France, Lesseps kept the investment and supply of workers flowing long after it was obvious that the targets were not being met, but eventually the money ran out. The French effort went bankrupt in 1889 after reportedly spending US$287,000,000; an estimated 22,000 men died from disease and accidents, and the savings of 800,000 investors were lost. Work was suspended on May 15, and in the ensuing scandal, known as the Panama affair, some of those deemed responsible were prosecuted, including Gustave Eiffel. Lesseps and his son Charles were found guilty of misappropriation of funds and sentenced to five years' imprisonment. This sentence was later overturned, and the father, at age 88, was never imprisoned.

In 1894, a second French company, the Compagnie Nouvelle du Canal de Panama, was created to take over the project. A minimal workforce of a few thousand people was employed primarily to comply with the terms of the Colombian Panama Canal concession, to run the Panama Railroad, and to maintain the existing excavation and equipment in salable condition. The company sought a buyer for these assets, with an asking price of US$109,000,000. In the meantime, they continued with enough activity to maintain their franchise. Phillipe Bunau-Varilla, the French manager of the New Panama Canal Company, eventually managed to persuade Lesseps that a lock-and-lake canal was more realistic than a sea-level canal.The Comité Technique, a high level technical committee, was formed by the Compagnie Nouvelle to review the studies and work—that already finished and that still ongoing—and come up with the best plan for completing the canal. The committee arrived on the Isthmus in February 1896 and went immediately, quietly and efficiently about their work of devising the best possible canal plan, which they presented on November 16, 1898. Many aspects of the plan were similar in principle to the canal that was finally built by the Americans in 1914. It was a lock canal with two high level lakes to lift ships up and over the Continental Divide. There would be eight sets of locks, two at Bohio Soldado and two at Obispo on the Atlantic side; one at Paraiso, two at Pedro Miguel, and one at Miraflores on the Pacific. Artificial lakes would be formed by damming the Chagres River at Bohio and Alhajuela, providing both flood control and electric power.

United States acquisition

At this time, the President and the Senate of the United States were interested in establishing a canal across the isthmus, with some favoring a canal across Nicaragua and others advocating the purchase of the French interests in Panama. Bunau-Varilla, who was seeking American involvement, asked for $100 million, but accepted $40 million in the face of the Nicaraguan option. In June 1902, the US Senate voted in favor of the Spooner Act, to pursue the Panamanian option, provided the necessary rights could be obtained.

On January 22, 1903, the Hay–Herrán Treaty was signed by United States Secretary of State John M. Hay and Colombian Chargé Dr. Tomás Herrán. For $10 million and an annual payment, it would have granted the United States a renewable lease in perpetuity from Colombia on the land proposed for the canal. The treaty was ratified by the US Senate on March 14, 1903, but the Senate of Colombia did not ratify it. Bunau-Varilla told President Theodore Roosevelt and Hay of a possible revolt by Panamanian rebels who aimed to separate from Colombia, and hoped that the United States would support the rebels with US troops and money.

Roosevelt changed tactics, based in part on the Mallarino–Bidlack Treaty of 1846, and actively supported the separation of Panama from Colombia. Shortly after recognizing Panama, he signed a treaty with the new Panamanian government under terms similar to the Hay–Herrán Treaty.

On November 2, 1903, US warships blocked sea lanes against possible Colombian troop movements en route to put down the Panama rebellion. Panama declared independence on November 3, 1903. The United States quickly recognized the new nation. This happened so quickly that by the time the Colombian government in Bogotá launched a response to the Panamanian uprising US troops had already entered the rebelling province. It should also be stated that the Colombian troops dispatched to Panama were hastily assembled conscripts with little training. While these conscripts may have been able to defeat the Panamanian rebels, they would not have been able to defeat the US army troops that were supporting the Panamanian rebels. The reason an army of conscripts was sent was that it was the best response the Colombians could muster, as Colombia still was recovering from a civil war between Liberals and Conservatives from October, 1899 to November, 1902 known as the "Thousand Days War". With the US being fully aware of these conditions and even incorporating them into the planning of the Panama intervention as the US acted as an arbitrator between the two sides; with the peace treaty that ended the "Thousand Days War" being signed on the USS Wisconsin on November 21, 1902. While in port the US also brought engineering teams to Panama, with the peace delegation, to begin planning for the canal's construction before the US had even gained the rights to build the canal. All these factors would result in the Colombians being unable to put down the Panamanian rebellion and expel the United States troops occupying what today is the independent nation of Panama.

On November 6, 1903, Philippe Bunau-Varilla, as Panama's ambassador to the United States, signed the Hay–Bunau-Varilla Treaty, granting rights to the United States to build and indefinitely administer the Panama Canal Zone and its defenses.  This is sometimes misinterpreted as the "99-year lease" because of misleading wording included in article 22 of the agreement. Almost immediately, the treaty was condemned by many Panamanians as an infringement on their country's new national sovereignty. This would later become a contentious diplomatic issue among Colombia, Panama, and the United States.

President Roosevelt famously stated, "I took the Isthmus, started the canal and then left Congress not to debate the canal, but to debate me." Several parties in the United States called this an act of war on Colombia: The New York Times described the support given by the United States to Bunau-Varilla as an "act of sordid conquest". The New York Evening Post called it a "vulgar and mercenary venture". The US maneuvers are often cited as the classic example of US gunboat diplomacy in Latin America, and the best illustration of what Roosevelt meant by the old African adage, "Speak softly and carry a big stick [and] you will go far." After the revolution in 1903, the Republic of Panama became a US protectorate until 1939.

In 1904, the United States purchased the French equipment and excavations, including the Panama Railroad, for US$40 million, of which $30 million related to excavations completed, primarily in the Culebra Cut, valued at about $1.00 per cubic yard. The United States also paid the new country of Panama $10 million and a $250,000 payment each following year.

In 1921, Colombia and the United States entered into the Thomson–Urrutia Treaty, in which the United States agreed to pay Colombia $25 million: $5 million upon ratification, and four-$5 million annual payments, and grant Colombia special privileges in the Canal Zone. In return, Colombia recognized Panama as an independent nation.

United States construction of the Panama canal, 1904–1914

The US formally took control of the canal property on May 4, 1904, inheriting from the French a depleted workforce and a vast jumble of buildings, infrastructure, and equipment, much of it in poor condition. A US government commission, the Isthmian Canal Commission (ICC), was established to oversee construction; it was given control of the Panama Canal Zone, over which the United States exercised sovereignty. The commission reported directly to Secretary of War William Howard Taft and was directed to avoid the inefficiency and corruption that had plagued the French 15 years earlier.

On May 6, 1904, President Theodore Roosevelt appointed John Findley Wallace, formerly chief engineer and finally general manager of the Illinois Central Railroad, as chief engineer of the Panama Canal Project. Overwhelmed by the disease-plagued country and forced to use often dilapidated French infrastructure and equipment, as well as being frustrated by the overly bureaucratic ICC, Wallace resigned abruptly in June 1905. The ICC brought on a new chairman, Theodore P. Shonts, and a new chief engineer was appointed, John Frank Stevens, a self-educated engineer who had built the Great Northern Railroad. Stevens was not a member of the ICC; he increasingly viewed its bureaucracy as a serious hindrance, bypassing the commission and sending requests and demands directly to the Roosevelt administration in Washington, DC.

One of Stevens' first achievements in Panama was in building and rebuilding the housing, cafeterias, hotels, water systems, repair shops, warehouses, and other infrastructure needed by the thousands of incoming workers. Stevens began the recruitment effort to entice thousands of workers from the United States and other areas to come to the Canal Zone to work.  Workers from the Caribbean—called "Afro-Panamanians"—came in large numbers and many settled permanently.  Stevens tried to provide accommodation in which the workers could work and live in reasonable safety and comfort. He also re-established and enlarged the railway, which was to prove crucial in transporting millions of tons of soil from the cut through the mountains to the dam across the Chagres River.

Colonel William C. Gorgas had been appointed chief sanitation officer of the canal construction project in 1904. Gorgas implemented a range of measures to minimize the spread of deadly diseases, particularly yellow fever and malaria, which had recently been shown to be mosquito-borne following the work of Dr. Carlos Finlay and Dr. Walter Reed. Investment was made in extensive sanitation projects, including city water systems, fumigation of buildings, spraying of insect-breeding areas with oil and larvicide, installation of mosquito netting and window screens, and elimination of stagnant water. Despite opposition from the commission (one member said his ideas were barmy), Gorgas persisted, and when Stevens arrived, he threw his weight behind the project. After two years of extensive work, the mosquito-spread diseases were nearly eliminated. Even after all that effort, about 5,600 workers died of disease and accidents during the US construction phase of the canal.

In 1905, a US engineering panel was commissioned to review the canal design, which had not been finalized. In January 1906 the panel, in a majority of eight to five, recommended to President Roosevelt a sea-level canal, as had been attempted by the French and temporarily abandoned by them in 1887 for a ten locks system designed by Philippe Bunau-Varilla, and definitively in 1898 for a lock-and-lake canal designed by the Comité Technique of the Compagnie Nouvelle de Canal de Panama as conceptualized by Adolphe Godin de Lépinay in 1879. But in 1906 Stevens, who had seen the Chagres in full flood, was summoned to Washington; he declared a sea-level approach to be "an entirely untenable proposition". This would create both the largest dam (Gatun Dam) and the largest human-made lake (Gatun Lake) in the world at that time. The water to refill the locks would be taken from Gatun Lake by opening and closing enormous gates and valves and letting gravity propel the water from the lake. Gatun Lake would connect to the Pacific through the mountains at the Gaillard (Culebra) Cut. Unlike Godin de Lépinay with the Congrès International d'Etudes du Canal Interocéanique, Stevens successfully convinced Roosevelt of the necessity and feasibility of this alternative scheme.

As quickly as possible, the Americans replaced or upgraded the old, unusable French equipment with new construction equipment that was designed for a much larger and faster scale of work. 102 large, railroad-mounted steam shovels were purchased, 77 from Bucyrus-Erie, and 25 from the Marion Power Shovel Company. These were joined by enormous steam-powered cranes, giant hydraulic rock crushers, concrete mixers, dredges, and pneumatic power drills, nearly all of which were manufactured by new, extensive machine-building technology developed and built in the United States. The railroad also had to be comprehensively upgraded with heavy-duty, double-tracked rails over most of the line to accommodate new rolling stock. In many places, the new Gatun Lake flooded over the original rail line, and a new line had to be constructed above Gatun Lake's waterline.

Between 1912 and 1914 there was a controversy about the tolls for the canal.

Goethals replaces Stevens as chief engineer

In 1907, Stevens resigned as chief engineer. His replacement, appointed by President Theodore Roosevelt, was US Army Major George Washington Goethals of the US Army Corps of Engineers. Soon to be promoted to lieutenant colonel and later to general, he was a strong, West Point-trained leader and civil engineer with experience in canals (unlike Stevens). Goethals directed the work in Panama to a successful conclusion in 1914, two years ahead of the target date of June 10, 1916.

Goethals divided the engineering and excavation work into three divisions: Atlantic, Central, and Pacific. The Atlantic Division, under Major William L. Sibert, was responsible for construction of the massive breakwater at the entrance to Limon Bay, the Gatun locks, and their  approach channel, and the immense Gatun Dam. The Pacific Division, under Sydney B. Williamson (the only civilian member of this high-level team), was similarly responsible for the Pacific  breakwater in Panama Bay, the approach channel to the locks, and the Miraflores and Pedro Miguel locks and their associated dams and reservoirs.

The Central Division, under Major David du Bose Gaillard of the United States Army Corps of Engineers, was assigned one of the most difficult parts: excavating the Culebra Cut through the continental divide to connect Gatun Lake to the Pacific Panama Canal locks.

On October 10, 1913, President Woodrow Wilson sent a signal from the White House by telegraph which triggered the explosion that destroyed the Gamboa Dike. This flooded the Culebra Cut, thereby joining the Atlantic and Pacific oceans via the Panama Canal. Alexandre La Valley (a floating crane built by Lobnitz & Company and launched in 1887) was the first self-propelled vessel to transit the canal from ocean to ocean. This vessel crossed the canal from the Atlantic in stages during construction, finally reaching the Pacific on January 7, 1914. SS Cristobal (a cargo and passenger ship built by Maryland Steel, and launched in 1902 as SS Tremont) on August 3, 1914, was the first ship to transit the canal from ocean to ocean.

The construction of the canal was completed in 1914, 401 years after Panama was first crossed overland by the Europeans in Vasco Núñez de Balboa's party of conquistadores. The United States spent almost $500 million (roughly equivalent to $ billion in ) to finish the project. This was by far the largest American engineering project to date. The canal was formally opened on August 15, 1914, with the passage of the cargo ship .

The opening of the Panama Canal in 1914 caused a severe drop in traffic along Chilean ports due to shifts in maritime trade routes, despite the closure of the canal for nearly seven months after a land-slide in the Culebra Cut on September 18, 1915.  The burgeoning sheep farming business in southern Patagonia suffered a significant setback by the change in trade routes, as did the economy of the Falkland Islands.

Throughout this time, Ernest "Red" Hallen was hired by the Isthmian Canal Commission to document the progress of the work.

In 1914 steam shovels from the Panama Canal were purchased and put to use in Chuquicamata copper mine of northern Chile.

Later developments

By the 1930s, water supply became an issue for the canal, prompting construction of the Madden Dam across the Chagres River above Gatun Lake. Completed in 1935, the dam created Madden Lake (later Alajuela Lake), which provides additional water storage for the canal. In 1939, construction began on a further major improvement: a new set of locks large enough to carry the larger warships that the United States was building at the time and planned to continue building. The work proceeded for several years, and significant excavation was carried out on the new approach channels, but the project was canceled after World War II.

After World War II, US control of the canal and the Canal Zone surrounding it became contentious; relations between Panama and the United States became increasingly tense. Many Panamanians felt that the Zone rightfully belonged to Panama; student protests were met by the fencing-in of the zone and an increased military presence there. Demands for the United States to hand over the canal to Panama increased after the Suez Crisis in 1956, when the United States used financial and diplomatic pressure to force France and the UK to abandon their attempt to retake control of the Suez Canal, previously nationalized by the Nasser regime in Egypt. Panamanian unrest culminated in riots on Martyr's Day, January 9, 1964, when about 20 Panamanians and 3–5 US soldiers were killed.

A decade later, in 1974, negotiations toward a settlement began and resulted in the Torrijos–Carter Treaties. On September 7, 1977, the treaty was signed by President of the United States Jimmy Carter and Omar Torrijos, de facto leader of Panama. This mobilized the process of granting the Panamanians free control of the canal so long as Panama signed a treaty guaranteeing the permanent neutrality of the canal. The treaty led to full Panamanian control effective at noon on December 31, 1999, and the Panama Canal Authority (ACP) assumed command of the waterway. The Panama Canal remains one of the chief revenue sources for Panama.

Before this handover, the government of Panama held an international bid to negotiate a 25-year contract for operation of the container shipping ports located at the canal's Atlantic and Pacific outlets. The contract was not affiliated with the ACP or Panama Canal operations and was won by the firm Hutchison Whampoa, a Hong Kong–based shipping interest owned by Li Ka-shing.

Canal

Layout

While globally the Atlantic Ocean is east of the isthmus and the Pacific is west, the general direction of the canal passage from the Atlantic to the Pacific is from northwest to southeast, because of the shape of the isthmus at the point the canal occupies. The Bridge of the Americas at the Pacific side is about a third of a degree east of the Colón end on the Atlantic side. Still, in formal nautical communications, the simplified directions "southbound" and "northbound" are used.

The canal consists of artificial lakes, several improved and artificial channels, and three sets of locks. An additional artificial lake, Alajuela Lake (known during the American era as Madden Lake), acts as a reservoir for the canal. The layout of the canal as seen by a ship passing from the Atlantic to the Pacific is:

 From the formal marking line of the Atlantic Entrance, one enters Limón Bay (Bahía Limón), a large natural harbor. The entrance runs . It provides a deepwater port (Cristóbal), with facilities like multimodal cargo exchange (to and from train) and the Colón Free Trade Zone (a free port).
 A  channel forms the approach to the locks from the Atlantic side.
It is the summit canal stretch, fed by the Gatun River and emptied by basic lock operations.
Here the upper Chagres River feeds the high-level-canal stretch.
 The Culebra Cut slices  through the mountain ridge, crosses the continental divide and passes under the Centennial Bridge.
 From the Miraflores Locks one reaches Balboa harbor, again with multimodal exchange provision (here the railway meets the shipping route again). Nearby is Panama City.
 From this harbor an entrance/exit channel leads to the Pacific Ocean (Gulf of Panama),  from the Miraflores Locks, passing under the Bridge of the Americas.

Navigation

Gatun Lake

Created in 1913 by damming the Chagres River, the Gatun Lake is a key part of the Panama Canal, providing the millions of liters of water necessary to operate its locks each time a ship passes through. At time of formation, Gatun Lake was the largest human-made lake in the world. 

The largest island on Gatun Lake is Barro Colorado Island. It was established for scientific study when the lake was formed, and is operated by the Smithsonian Institution. Many important scientific and biological discoveries of the tropical animal and plant kingdom originated here. Ecotourism on the lake has become an industry for Panamanians.

Gatun Lake also provides drinking water for Panama City and Colón. Fishing is one of the primary recreational pursuits on Gatun Lake. Non-native peacock bass were introduced by accident to Gatun Lake around 1967 by a local businessman, and have since flourished to become the dominant angling game fish in Gatun Lake. Locally called Sargento and believed to be the species Cichla pleiozona, these peacock bass originate from the Amazon, Rio Negro, and Orinoco river basins, where they are considered a premier game fish.

Lock size

The size of the locks determines the maximum size ship that can pass through. Because of the importance of the canal to international trade, many ships are built to the maximum size allowed. These are known as Panamax vessels. A Panamax cargo ship typically has a deadweight tonnage (DWT) of 65,000–80,000 tons, but its actual cargo is restricted to about 52,500 tons because of the  draft restrictions within the canal.

In 1908, the United States Navy requested that an increased width of at least  to allow the passage of US naval ships. Panama Canal pilots were initially unprepared to handle the significant flight deck overhang of aircraft carriers.  knocked over all the adjacent concrete lamp posts while passing through the Gatun Locks for the first time in 1928. It is the size of the locks, specifically the Pedro Miguel Locks, along with the height of the Bridge of the Americas at Balboa, that determine the Panamax metric and limit the size of ships that may use the canal.

The 2006 third set of locks project has created larger locks, allowing bigger ships to transit through deeper and wider channels. The allowed dimensions of ships using these locks increased by 25 percent in length, 51 percent in beam, and 26 percent in draft, as defined by New Panamax metrics.

Tolls

As with a toll road, vessels transiting the canal must pay tolls. Tolls for the canal are set by the Panama Canal Authority and are based on vessel type, size, and the type of cargo.

For container ships, the toll is assessed on the ship's capacity expressed in twenty-foot equivalent units (TEUs), one TEU being the size of a standard intermodal shipping container. Effective April 1, 2016, this toll went from US$74 per loaded container to $60 per TEU capacity plus $30 per loaded container for a potential $90 per TEU when the ship is full. The toll is calculated differently for passenger ships and for container ships carrying no cargo ("in ballast"). , the ballast rate is US$60, down from US$65.60 per TEU.

Passenger vessels in excess of 30,000 tons (PC/UMS) pay a rate based on the number of berths, that is, the number of passengers that can be accommodated in permanent beds. The per-berth charge since April 1, 2016 is $111 for unoccupied berths and $138 for occupied berths in the Panamax locks. Started in 2007, this fee has greatly increased the tolls for such ships. Passenger vessels of less than 30,000 tons or less than 33 tons per passenger are charged according to the same per-ton schedule as are freighters. Almost all major cruise ships have more than 33 tons per passenger; the rule of thumb for cruise line comfort is generally given as a minimum of 40 tons per passenger.

(The calculation of tonnage for commercial vessels is quite complex.) , this toll is US$5.25 per ton for the first 10,000 tons, US$5.14 per ton for the next 10,000 tons, and US$5.06 per ton thereafter. As with container ships, reduced tolls are charged for freight ships "in ballast", $4.19, $4.12, $4.05 respectively.

On 1 April 2016, a more complicated toll system was introduced, having the neopanamax locks at a higher rate in some cases, natural gas transport as a new separate category and other changes. As of October 1, 2017, there are modified tolls and categories of tolls in effect. Small (less than 125 ft) vessels up to 583 PC/UMS net tons when carrying passengers or cargo, or up to 735 PC/UMS net tons when in ballast, or up to 1,048 fully loaded displacement tons, are assessed minimum tolls based upon their length overall, according to the following table (as of 29 April 2015):

Morgan Adams of Los Angeles, California, holds the distinction of paying the first toll received by the United States Government for the use of the Panama Canal by a pleasure boat. His boat Lasata passed through the Zone on August 14, 1914. The crossing occurred during a  sea voyage from Jacksonville, Florida, to Los Angeles in 1914.

The most expensive regular toll for canal passage to date was charged on April 14, 2010, to the cruise ship Norwegian Pearl, which paid US$375,600. The average toll is around US$54,000. The highest fee for priority passage charged through the Transit Slot Auction System was US$220,300, paid on August 24, 2006, by the Panamax tanker Erikoussa, bypassing a 90-ship queue waiting for the end of maintenance work on the Gatun Locks, and thus avoiding a seven-day delay. The normal fee would have been just US$13,430.

The lowest toll ever paid was 36 cents, by American Richard Halliburton who swam the Panama Canal in 1928.

Issues leading to expansion

Efficiency and maintenance

Opponents to the 1977 Torrijos-Carter Treaties feared that efficiency and maintenance would suffer following the US withdrawal from the Panama Canal Zone; however, this has been proven not to be the case. Capitalizing on practices developed during the American administration, canal operations are improving under Panamanian control. Canal Waters Time (CWT), the average time it takes a vessel to navigate the canal, including waiting time, is a key measure of efficiency; according to the ACP, since 2000, it has ranged between 20 and 30 hours. The accident rate has also not changed appreciably in the past decade, varying between 10 and 30 accidents each year from about 14,000 total annual transits. An official accident is one in which a formal investigation is requested and conducted.

Increasing volumes of imports from Asia, which previously landed on US West Coast ports, are now passing through the canal to the American East Coast. The total number of ocean-going transits increased from 11,725 in 2003 to 13,233 in 2007, falling to 12,855 in 2009. (The canal's fiscal year runs from October through September.) This has been coupled with a steady rise in average ship size and in the numbers of Panamax vessels passing through the canal, so that the total tonnage carried rose from 227.9 million PC/UMS tons in fiscal year 1999 to a then record high of 312.9 million tons in 2007, and falling to 299.1 million tons in 2009. Tonnage for fiscal 2013, 2014 and 2015 was 320.6, 326.8 and 340.8 million PC/UMS tons carried on 13,660, 13,481 and 13,874 transits respectively.
In the first decade after the transfer to Panamanian control, the Panama Canal Authority (ACP) invested nearly US$1 billion in widening and modernizing the canal, with the aim of increasing capacity by 20 percent. The ACP cites a number of major improvements, including the widening and straightening of the Culebra Cut to reduce restrictions on passing vessels, the deepening of the navigational channel in Gatun Lake to reduce draft restrictions and improve water supply, and the deepening of the Atlantic and Pacific entrances to the canal. This is supported by new equipment, such as a new drill barge and suction dredger, and an increase of the tug boat fleet by 20 percent. Improvements have been made to the traffic management system to allow more efficient control over ships in the canal.

In December 2010, record-breaking rains caused a 17-hour closure of the canal; this was the first closure since the United States invasion of Panama in 1989. The rains also caused an access road to the Centenario Bridge to collapse.

Capacity
The canal handles more vessel traffic than had ever been envisioned by its builders. In 1934 it was estimated that the maximum capacity of the canal would be around 80 million tons per year; as noted above, canal traffic in 2015 reached 340.8 million tons of shipping.

To improve capacity, a number of improvements have been made to maximize the use of the locking system:
 Implementation of an enhanced locks lighting system;
 Construction of two tie-up stations in Culebra Cut;
 Improvements to the tugboat fleet;
 Implementation of the carousel lockage system in Gatun locks;
 Development of an improved vessel scheduling system;
 Deepening of Gatun Lake navigational channels from  PLD;
 Deepening of the Pacific and Atlantic entrances;
 Construction of a new spillway in Gatun, for flood control.
These improvements enlarged the capacity from 300 million PCUMS (2008) to 340 PCUMS (2012). These improvements were started before the new locks project, and are complementary to it.

Competition

The canal faces increasing competition from other quarters. Because canal tolls have risen as ships have become larger, some critics have suggested that the Suez Canal is now a viable alternative for cargo en route from Asia to the US East Coast. The Panama Canal, however, continues to serve more than 144 of the world's trade routes and the majority of canal traffic comes from the "all-water route" from Asia to the US East and Gulf Coasts.

On June 15, 2013, Nicaragua awarded the Hong Kong-based HKND Group a 50-year concession to develop a canal through the country.

The increasing rate of melting of ice in the Arctic Ocean has led to speculation that the Northwest Passage or Arctic Bridge may become viable for commercial shipping. This route would save  on the route from Asia to Europe compared with the Panama Canal, possibly leading to a diversion of some traffic to that route. However, such a route is beset by unresolved territorial issues and would still hold significant problems owing to ice.

Water issues

Gatun Lake is filled with rainwater, and the lake accumulates excess water during wet months. Since a ship will have to go upward to Gatun Lake first and then descend, a single passing will cost double the amount; but the same waterflow cycle can be used for another ship passing in the opposite direction. The ship's submerged volume is not relevant to this amount of water. During the dry season, when there is less rainfall, there is also a shortage of water in Gatun Lake.

As a signatory to the United Nations Global Compact and member of the World Business Council for Sustainable Development, the ACP has developed an environmentally and socially sustainable program for expansion, which protects the aquatic and terrestrial resources of the canal watershed. The expansion guarantees the availability and quality of water resources by using water-saving basins at each new lock. These water-saving basins diminish water loss and preserve freshwater resources along the waterway by reusing water from the basins into the locks. Each lock chamber has three water-saving basins, which reuse 60 percent of the water in each transit. There are a total of nine basins for each of the two lock complexes, and a total of 18 basins for the entire project.

The mean sea level at the Pacific side is about  higher than that of the Atlantic side due to differences in ocean conditions such as water density and weather.

Third set of locks project (expansion)

As demand is rising for efficient global shipping of goods, the canal is positioned to be a significant feature of world shipping for the foreseeable future. However, changes in shipping patterns —particularly the increasing numbers of larger-than-Panamax ships— necessitated changes to the canal for it to retain a significant market share. In 2006 it was anticipated that by 2011, 37 percent of the world's container ships would be too large for the present canal, and hence a failure to expand would result in a significant loss of market share. The maximum sustainable capacity of the original canal, given some relatively minor improvement work, was estimated at 340 million PC/UMS tons per year; it was anticipated that this capacity would be reached between 2009 and 2012. Close to 50 percent of transiting vessels were already using the full width of the locks.

The proposal to expand the canal was approved in a national referendum by about 80 percent on October 22, 2006. The canal expansion was built between 2007 and 2016.

The expansion plan had two new flights of locks built parallel to, and operated in addition to, the old locks: one east of the existing Gatun locks, and one southwest of the Miraflores locks, each supported by approach channels. Each flight ascends from sea level directly to the level of Gatun Lake; the existing two-stage ascent at Miraflores and Pedro Miguel locks was not replicated.

The new locks are supported by new approach channels, including a  channel at Miraflores from the locks to the Gaillard Cut, skirting Miraflores Lake. The Gaillard Cut and the channel through Gatun Lake were widened to at least  on the straight portions and at least  on the bends.

These gravity-fed basins allow 60 percent of the water used in each transit to be reused; the new locks consequently use 7 percent less water per transit than each of the existing lock lanes. The deepening of Gatun Lake and the raising of its maximum water level also provide capacity for significantly more water storage. These measures are intended to allow the expanded canal to operate without constructing new reservoirs.

The project was designed to allow for an anticipated growth in traffic from 280 million PC/UMS tons in 2005 to nearly 510 million PC/UMS tons in 2025. The expanded canal will have a maximum sustainable capacity of about 600 million PC/UMS tons per year. Tolls will continue to be calculated based on vessel tonnage, and in some cases depend on the locks used.

An article in the February 2007 issue of Popular Mechanics magazine described the engineering aspects of the expansion project. There is also a follow-up article in the February 2010 issue of Popular Mechanics.

On September 3, 2007, thousands of Panamanians stood across from Paraíso Hill in Panama to witness a huge initial explosion and launch of the Expansion Program. By June 2012, a 30 m reinforced concrete monolith had been completed, the first of 46 such monoliths which will line the new Pacific-side lock walls. By early July 2012, however, it was announced that the canal expansion project had fallen six months behind schedule, leading expectations for the expansion to open in April 2015 rather than October 2014, as originally planned. By September 2014, the new gates were projected to be open for transit at the "beginning of 2016".

It was announced in July 2009 that the Belgian dredging company Jan De Nul, together with a consortium of contractors consisting of the Spanish Sacyr Vallehermoso, the Italian Impregilo, and the Panamanian company Grupo Cusa, had been awarded the contract to build the six new locks for US$3.1 billion, which was one billion less than the next highest competing bid due to having a concrete budget 71 percent smaller than that of the next bidder and allotted roughly 25 percent less for steel to reinforce that concrete. The contract resulted in $100 million in dredging works over the next few years for the Belgian company and a great deal of work for its construction division. The design of the locks is a carbon copy of the Berendrecht Lock, which is 68 m wide and 500 m long, making it the second largest lock in the world after the Kieldrecht lock in the port of Antwerp, Belgium. Completed in 1989 by the Port of Antwerp, which De Nul helped build, the company still has engineers and specialists who were part of that project.

In January 2014, a contract dispute threatened the progress of the project. There was a delay of less than two months however, with work by the consortium members reaching goals by June 2014.

In June 2015, flooding of the new locks began: first on the Atlantic side, then on the Pacific; by then, the canal's re-inauguration was slated for April 2016. On March 23, 2016, the expansion inauguration was set for June 26, 2016.

The new locks opened for commercial traffic on 26 June 2016, and the first ship to cross the canal using the third set of locks was a modern New Panamax vessel, the Chinese-owned container ship Cosco Shipping Panama. The original locks, now over 100 years old, allow engineers greater access for maintenance, and are projected to continue operating indefinitely.

The total cost is unknown since the expansion's contractors are seeking at least an additional  from the canal authority due to excess expenses.

Competitive projects

Nicaragua canal

On July 7, 2014, Wang Jing, chairman of the HK Nicaragua Canal Development Investment Co. Ltd. (HKND Group) advised that a route for Nicaragua's proposed canal had been approved. The construction work was projected by HKND to begin in 2014 and take 5 years, although there had been little progress before the project's abandonment. The Nicaraguan parliament approved plans for the  canal through Nicaragua and according to the deal, the company would have been responsible for operating and maintaining the canal for a 50-year period. By May 2017, no concrete action had been reportedly taken constructing the canal and further doubts were expressed about its financing. In February 2018, analysts widely viewed the project as defunct, though the head of the project insisted work was on-going and HKND retained the legal rights to the concession for the canal as well as side projects. Despite HKND vanishing in April 2018, the Nicaraguan government indicates that it will continue with the 908 km2 (351 sq mi) dry land expropriations within Nicaragua, under land expropriation Canal Law 840.

Colombia rail link
In 2011, Colombia's then-president Juan Manuel Santos announced a proposal for a  railway between Colombia's Pacific and Caribbean coasts. However, in 2015 the director of the Colombia-China Chamber of Commerce said the proposal "was mentioned in 2011 and subsequently had minimal relevance".

Northwest Passage

Climate change has thinned much of the ice that in the past made this route between the Atlantic and Pacific oceans impassable. Satellite navigation can help monitor location of the ice which remains, further easing transit. A few ships have successfully crossed the previously impossible route since 2000.

Other projects

Individuals, companies, and governments have explored the possibility of constructing deep water ports and rail links connecting coasts as a "dry canal" in Guatemala, Costa Rica, and El Salvador/Honduras. However, plans to construct these sea-rail-sea links have yet to materialize. Another option could have been the Ferrocarril Transístmico in Mexico if implemented for ships.

Master Key to Panama Canal and Honorary Pilots
During the last one hundred years, the Panama Canal Authority has granted membership in the "Esteemed Order of Bearers of the Master Key of the Panama Canal" and appointed a few "Honorary Lead Pilots" to employees, captains and dignitaries.  One of the most recent of these were U.S. Federal Maritime Commissioner, Louis Sola, who was awarded for his work for supporting seafarers during the COVID-19 pandemic and previously transiting the canal more than 100 times.  Another recent award was to Commodore Ronald Warwick, a former Master of the Cunard Liners Queen Elizabeth 2 and RMS Queen Mary 2, who has traversed the Canal more than 50 times, and Senior Captain Raffaele Minotauro, an Unlimited Oceangoing Shipmaster Senior Grade, of the former Italian governmental navigation company known as the "Italian Line".

See also

 Ajax (crane barge)
 Canal des Deux Mers
 Canal Zone Police
 Corinth Canal
 List of waterways
 Panama Canal Zone
 Suez Canal

References

Further reading

Construction and technical issues
 Brodhead, Michael J. 2012. "The Panama Canal: Writings of the U. S. Army Corps of Engineers Officers Who Conceived and Built It." US Army Corps of Engineers History Office, Alexandria, VA.
 
 Jaen, Omar. (2005). Las Negociaciones de los Tratados Torrijos-Carter, 1970–1979 (Tomos 1 y 2). Panama: Autoridad del Canal de Panama.  (Obra completa)
 Jorden, William J. (1984). Panama Odyssey. 746 pages, illustrated. Austin: University of Texas Press. 
 
  A Project Gutenberg free ebook.
 Parker, Matthew. (2007). Panama Fever: The Epic Story of One of the Greatest Human Achievements of All Time—The Building of the Panama Canal. New York: Doubleday. 
 Sherman, Gary. "Conquering the Landscape (Gary Sherman explores the life of the great American trailblazer, John Frank Stevens)," History Magazine, July 2008.

Diplomatic and political history
 Gilboa, Eytan. "The Panama Invasion Revisited: Lessons for the Use of Force in the Post Cold War Era." Political Science Quarterly (1995): 539–562. in JSTOR
 Greene, Julie, The Canal Builders: Making America's Empire at the Panama Canal (New York: Penguin Press, 2009)
 Hogan, J. Michael. "Theodore Roosevelt and the Heroes of Panama" Presidential Studies Quarterly 19 (1989): 79–94. 
 LaFeber, Walter. The Panama Canal: the crisis in historical perspective (Oxford University Press, 1978)
 Long, Tom. "Putting the canal on the map: Panamanian Agenda-setting and the 1973 Security Council Meetings," Diplomatic History, 38, No. 2 (2014): pp. 431–455.
 Major, John. Prize Possession: The United States and the Panama Canal, 1903–1979 (1993)
 Maurer, Noel, and Carlos Yu. The Big Ditch: How America Took, Ran, and Ultimately Gave Away the Panama Canal (Princeton University Press, 2010); 420 pp.  . Econometric analysis of costs ($9 billion in 2009 dollars) and benefits to US and Panama
Mellander, Gustavo A., Mellander, Nelly, Charles Edward Magoon: The Panama Years. Río Piedras, Puerto Rico: Editorial Plaza Mayor. ISBN 1-56328-155-4. OCLC 42970390. (1999)
Mellander, Gustavo A., The United States in Panamanian Politics: The Intriguing Formative Years." Danville, Ill.: Interstate Publishers. OCLC 138568. (1971)
 Sánchez, Peter M. Panama Lost? U.S. Hegemony, Democracy and the Canal (University Press of Florida, 2007), 251 pp,
 Sánchez, Peter M.  "The end of hegemony? Panama and the United States." International Journal on World Peace (2002): 57–89. in JSTOR

External links

 Panama Canal Authority website —Has a simulation showing how the canal works
 Making the Dirt Fly, Building the Panama Canal Smithsonian Institution Libraries
 Canalmuseum—History, Documents, Photographs and Stories
 Early stereographic images of the construction  University of California
 A. B. Nichols Panama Canal Collection at the Linda Hall Library Archival collection of maps, blueprints, photographs, letters, and other documents, collected by Aurin B. Nichols , an engineer who worked on the canal project through from 1899 until its completion.
 Newspaper articles and clippings about the Panama Canal at Newspapers.com
 Panama Canal Collection

Panama Canal at nationsonline.org

 
Canals in Panama
Ship canals
Water transport in Panama
Coasts of Panama
Economy of Panama
Geography of Panama
History of Panama
Macro-engineering
Transport infrastructure in Panama
Canals opened in 1914
1914 establishments in Panama
1914 establishments in the United States
1914 in Central America
Panamanian coasts of the Caribbean Sea
Panamanian coasts of the Pacific Ocean
Historic Civil Engineering Landmarks
Historic American Engineering Record in the former Panama Canal Zone
1890s in Panama
1880s in Panama